The 2000 Open 13 was an ATP men's tennis tournament held in Marseille, France that was part of the International Series of the 2000 ATP Tour. It was the seventh edition of the tournament and was held from 7 February until 14 February 2000. Unseeded Marc Rosset won the singles title, his third at the event after winning the first two editions in 1993 and 1994.

Finals

Singles

 Marc Rosset defeated  Roger Federer 2–6, 6–3, 7–6(7–5)
 It was Rosset's 1st singles title of the year and the 14th of his career.

Doubles

 Simon Aspelin /  Johan Landsberg defeated  Juan Ignacio Carrasco /  Jairo Velasco, Jr. 7–6(7–2), 6–4
 It was Aspelin's only title of the year and the 1st of his career. It was Landsberg's only title of the year and the 1st of his career.

References

External links
 Official website 
 ATP tournament profile
 ITF tournament edition details

 

Open 13
Open 13
Open 13